Dyakonovskaya is a rural locality (a village) in Nizhnekuloyskoye Rural Settlement, Verkhovazhsky District, Vologda Oblast, Russia. The population was 180 as of 2002. There are 13 streets.

Geography 
Dyakonovskaya is located 37 km southeast of Verkhovazhye (the district's administrative centre) by road. Urusovskaya is the nearest rural locality.

References 

Rural localities in Verkhovazhsky District